Metallurg is a Russian rugby club from Kemerovo Oblast. They participate in the Professional Rugby League, the top division of Russian rugby.

Current squad 

 
 
 

  
    

 

Russian rugby union teams
Professional Rugby League teams